Michael Fitzgerald also known as Mick Fitzgerald, (December 1881  – 17 October 1920) was among the first members of the Irish Republican Army and played an important role in organizing it. He rose to the rank of Commandant, Officer Commanding (OC) in the First Battalion, Cork Number 2 Brigade. He died in the 1920 hunger strike at Cork Gaol. His death is credited with bringing world-wide attention to the Irish cause for independence.

Early life 
Born in Ballyoran, Fermoy, County Cork, Fitzgerald was educated at the Christian Brothers School in the town and subsequently found work as a mill worker in the locality. He joined the Irish Volunteers in 1914 and played an important role in building the local organisation which was soon to become the Irish Republican Army (IRA). He soon rose to the rank of Battalion Commandant, 1st Battalion, Cork No.2 Brigade.

IRA activities 
On Easter Sunday, 20 April 1919 Michael Fitzgerald led a small group of IRA volunteers who captured Araglin, Cork Royal Irish Constabulary Barracks located on the border with Tipperary. He was subsequently arrested and sentenced to three months imprisonment at Cork Jail. Fitzgerald was released from prison in August 1919 and immediately returned to active IRA duty. He was involved in the holding up of a party of British Army troops at the Wesleyan Church in Fermoy. The troops were disarmed although one of them was killed.Arrested and held on remand, Mick Fitzgerald felt that the only chance he had for release was via a hunger strike.

1920 hunger strike 
Michael Fitzgerald, along with Terence MacSwiney and nine other IRA volunteers, were arrested on 8 August 1920. On 11 August 1920, MacSwiney began a hunger strike in Brixton Gaol. Fitzgerald and the other nine volunteers at Cork Gaol joined in. Twenty-four-year-old Fitzgerald was the first to die on 17 October 1920 as a result of his sixty seven day fast Days before his death the authorities refused Fitzgerald permission to marry his fiancée. He was followed by Joe Murphy and Terence McSwiney. Their deaths are credited with bringing world-wide attention to the Irish cause for independence and occurred just before the largest hunger strike in Irish history - the 1923 Irish Hunger Strikes. Their survival during the long hunger strike was credited the devotion and care provided by attending nuns.

Gravesite 
Michael Fitzgerald is buried at Kilcrumper Cemetery, on the outskirts of Fermoy. In addition, a road was named after him in Togher, Cork.

During a November 2008 visit to Fermoy, County Cork Sinn Féin Vice-President Pat Doherty laid a wreath at Fitzgerald's grave. Doherty said Fitzgerald's sacrifice was like that of the hunger strikers in 1981. He said it was a great honour for him to pay homage to a man "to whom we owe so much." Also buried in the Republican Plot in Fermoy is General Liam Lynch, who was Chief of Staff of the IRA when he was shot dead by Free State troops on the Knockmealdown Mountains on 12 April 1923. His last wish was to be buried with his great friend and comrade, Mick Fitzgerald.

See also 
Timeline of the Irish War of Independence

References

External links
The Irish Story archive on the Troubles
The Conflict in Ireland – 1991 Sinn Fein document

1881 births
1920 deaths
Irish republicans
Irish Republican Army (1919–1922) members
Irish Republicans killed during the Irish War of Independence
People from Fermoy
Irish prisoners who died on hunger strike